The 2005–06 Sussex County Football League season was the 81st in the history of Sussex County Football League a football competition in England.

Division One

Division One featured 17 clubs which competed in the division last season, along with three new clubs, promoted from Division Two:
Crowborough Athletic
Shoreham
Wick

League table

Division Two

Division Two featured 13 clubs which competed in the division last season, along with five new clubs.
Clubs relegated from Division One:
East Grinstead Town
Pagham
Sidlesham
Clubs promoted from Division Three:
Bexhill United
Storrington

Also, Seaford changed name to Seaford Town.

League table

Division Three

Division Three featured eleven clubs which competed in the division last season, along with three new clubs:
Little Common, joined from the East Sussex League
Peacehaven & Telscombe, relegated from Division Two
Pease Pottage Village, relegated from Division Two

League table

References

2005-06
9